The Mantanani scops owl (Otus mantananensis),  is a small owl in the scops-owl genus Otus found on small islands between Borneo and the Philippines. It is listed by the IUCN as "near threatened" because its range is limited with its population being fragmented on several different islands, and its forest habitat is being degraded by ongoing logging and clearance.

Description and Taxonomy 

This owl is about 18 cm long, with a wing length of about 15.5 cm. It has a buff facial disk with a narrow, dark border. It has dark brown upperparts with pale markings on the scapulars, and pale underparts with dark streaks and barring.  It has yellow irides, grey feet and bill, and feathered tarsi.

This owl hunts at the forest edge or in clearings, feeding mainly on insects. It is thought to breed from March to May with its eggs being laid in a tree hollow. The voice has been described as a simple waa and a goose-like honk, with a descending series of short was during territorial disputes. The female's voice is lower and harsher than that of the male.

Subspecies 
Four subspecies are recognized:

 O. m. romblonis- Found in Romblon, Tablas Island, Semirara Island, Sibuyan Island, Tres Reyes and Banton.
 O. m. cuyensis - Found in Dicabaito, Linapacan and surrounding islands in the southern Calamian Islands
 O. m. sibutuensis - Found in the Sibutu Islands and Tumindao
 O. m. mantanensis - Found in the surrounding islands of southern Palawan,

Habitat and Conservation Status
The Mantanani scops owl is endemic to small islands between the Malaysian state of Sabah in northern Borneo, such as the Mantanani group after which the species gets its common name, and the Philippines island of Palawan, including Calamien, Rasa and Ursula, as well as islands in the Sulu Archipelago and the central Philippines.

The Mantanani scops owl is considered to be near threatened because it is confined to increasingly disturbed and degraded habitats within a small range.  The BirdLife population estimate for the species over its entire range is 6,000 to 15,000 individuals and decreasing.  Estimates for the population on Mantanani Island are for at least 100 birds.

References

External links
 Arkive: photo of Mantanani Scops-owl by Tim Laman

Sources
 
 

Otus (bird)
Birds of East Malaysia
Birds of the Philippines
Birds described in 1892
Taxa named by Richard Bowdler Sharpe